Tractatus is Latin for "treatise".  It may refer to:

 Tractatus de amore by Andreas Capellanus
 Tractatus Astrologico Magicus, also known as the Aldaraia and the Book of Soyga,  a 16th-century Latin treatise on magic
 Tractatus coislinianus, an ancient manuscript on comedy in the tradition of Aristotle
Tractatus Eboracenses (Tractates of York), dealing with the relationship between kings and the Catholic Church, c. 1100
 Tractatus of Glanvill, the Tractatus de legibus et consuetudinibus regni Angliae (Treatise on the laws and customs of the Kingdom of England), the book of authority on English common law, written c. 1188 and attributed to Ranulf de Glanvill
 Tractatus Logico-Philosophicus, a philosophical work by Ludwig Wittgenstein
 Tractatus de Purgatorio Sancti Patricii (Treatise on Saint Patrick's Purgatory), a Latin text of c. 1180–84
Tractatus de Sphaera, or De sphaera mundi, the basic elements of astronomy written by Johannes de Sacrobosco c. 1230
 Tractatus de superstitionibus, a title shared by two medieval tractates on superstition

By Barauch Spinoza
 Tractatus de Intellectus Emendatione (On The Improvement Of The Understanding), an unfinished work by Baruch Spinoza
 Tractatus Theologico-Politicus, a philosophical work by Spinoza
Tractatus Politicus

See also 
 Tractate
 Wittgenstein Tractatus (film), a film by Peter Forgacs